Jungle Man-Eaters is a 1954 American adventure film directed by Lee Sholem starring Johnny Weissmuller, Karin Booth and Richard Stapley. It was the last official Jungle Jim movie after Screen Gems bought the rights to make a TV series based on the character (which also starred Weissmuller). With only three movies on his contract remaining, Weissmuller used them wisely by just playing himself, but the format stayed the same. Despite the title, there are no Jungle Man-Eaters shown in the film.

Plot
Jungle Jim is recruited to track down a group of French diamond smugglers who seek to alter the price of diamonds through taking over a secret diamond field.  The smugglers not only murder the original owners of the diamond field but set up inter-tribal warfare to prevent any intruders from learning of the diamond field.

Cast
Johnny Weissmuller as Jungle Jim
Karin Booth as Dr. Bonnie Crandall
Richard Stapley as Inspector Jeffrey Bernard 
Bernie Hamilton as Zuwaba
Gregory Gaye as Leroux 
Lester Matthews as	Comm. Kingston
 Paul Thompson as Zulu
 Vince Townsend Jr. as	Chief Boganda

References

External links
Jungle Man Eaters at TCMDB

Jungle Jim films
1954 films
Columbia Pictures films
1954 adventure films
American adventure films
1950s English-language films
American black-and-white films
1950s American films